Ayatosan Maru (綾戸山丸 貨物船) was a 9,788 gross ton (10,930DWT) freighter that was built by Tama Shipbuilding Co., Tamano for Mitsui & Co. Ltd. launched in 1939. She had been intended to run the New York passenger and freight run, however she was requisitioned by the Imperial Japanese Navy and fitted out as a high-speed transport, which was completed in May 1941.

During the invasion of Malaya she was damaged by Royal Australian Air Force Lockheed Hudson light bombers and a blaze broke out which was later extinguished. She was also damaged by a torpedo from the Dutch submarine .

Two other transports that had completed unloading escaped with their escort. She became known as "The Gona wreck" with allied patrols investigating and confirming the ship's identity. The wreck was later used to range artillery and as a bombing target by Allied forces.

Citations

1939 ships
Auxiliary ships of the Imperial Japanese Navy
Ships sunk by US aircraft
Ships sunk by Australian aircraft
Maritime incidents in July 1942
World War II shipwrecks in the Pacific Ocean